Parvocaulis is a genus of green algae in the family Polyphysaceae.

References

External links

Ulvophyceae genera
Dasycladales